Mackey Run is a  long 3rd order tributary to Muddy Creek in Crawford County, Pennsylvania.

Course
Mackey Run rises about 3 miles east of Woodcock, Pennsylvania, and then flows east-northeast to join Muddy Creek about 0.5 miles south of Eaton Corners.

Watershed
Mackey Run drains  of area, receives about 45.0 in/year of precipitation, has a wetness index of 457.36, and is about 69% forested.

See also
 List of rivers of Pennsylvania

References

Rivers of Pennsylvania
Rivers of Crawford County, Pennsylvania